

References
 
 
 
 

Automotive industry in the United States